Even the Dogs is British author Jon McGregor's third novel. First published in 2010, the novel focuses on drug addiction, alcoholism, homelessness, and dereliction. The Irish Times literary critic Eileen Battersby called it a "magnificent" novel. In 2012, Even the Dogs was awarded the International Dublin Literary Award, one of the world's richest literary prizes.

The Daily Telegraph published a positive review by David Robson, who remarked that the "movingly told story is also an important book."

Plot summary
Around Christmas one year, alcoholic Robert John Radcliffe's body is found in his flat. The novel traces, in a stream of consciousness style with occasional flashbacks, how his daughter Laura and her drug addict friends react as authorities investigate his death.

See also

2010 in literature
If Nobody Speaks of Remarkable Things

References

2010 British novels
Bloomsbury Publishing books
Novels by Jon McGregor